The following buildings were added to the National Register of Historic Places as part of the Mediterranean Revival Style Buildings of Davis Islands Multiple Property Submission (or MPS).

A number of them are designed or built by Schumacher & Winkler or by Fred Mayes.

References and external links

 Hillsborough County listings at Florida's Office of Cultural and Historical Programs

 Davis Islands
National Register of Historic Places Multiple Property Submissions in Florida
Mediterranean Revival architecture of Davis Islands, Tampa, Florida
Mediterranean